Crystallopollen is a genus of flowering plants belonging to the family Asteraceae.

Its native range is Tropical and Southern Africa.

Species:
 Crystallopollen angustifolium Steetz

References

Asteraceae
Asteraceae genera